Russell Findlay is a Scottish politician and journalist who has served as a Member of the Scottish Parliament (MSP) for the West Scotland region since 2021. A member of the Scottish Conservatives, he served as the party's director of communications.

Journalist career 
Findlay worked as a journalist for STV, the Scottish Sun and Sunday Mail.  His investigation into the disappearance of Margaret Fleming was used to help prosecute her killers. He has written three books, one of which is about his acid attack, and co-authored a fourth.

Acid attack 
In December 2015, while working as a journalist for The Sun reporting on gangs in Glasgow, he was subjected to a doorstep acid attack. William Burns disguised himself as a postal worker and threw sulphuric acid on Findlay before attacking with a knife. Findlay managed to hold Burns down long enough for the police to arrive and arrest him. Burns was sentenced to a ten-year jail term with five years of post-release supervision. Ten months before the attack, Gordon Smart, editor of The Sun, received a call that included threats against Findlay, which Smart did not reveal until days after the attack. Findlay initially returned to work for The Sun but later took sick leave and left with an agreement from his employer.

Political career

Member of the Scottish Parliament 
Findlay was selected as the Scottish Conservatives candidate for the Paisley constituency in the 2021 Scottish Parliament election. Failing to win the seat and coming third, he was elected to the party list as an additional member for the West Scotland region.

On 12 January 2022, Findlay called for Boris Johnson to resign as Conservative party leader and Prime Minister over the Westminster lockdown parties controversy along with a majority of Scottish Conservative MSPs.

On 27 December 2022, Findlay posted on Twitter a picture of himself holding a merkin, with a group of people in a pub, including Elaine Miller, who had flashed the Scottish Parliament and then those in the gallery, from the  gallery, following the conclusion of the last debate on the Gender Recognition Reform (Scotland) Bill.  In the post he criticised the police's decision to investigate Miller over her self-declared indecency.

Personal life 
He has a daughter.

References

External links 
 

Year of birth missing (living people)
Living people
Scottish journalists
Conservative MSPs
Members of the Scottish Parliament 2021–2026
Scottish television producers
Acid attack victims
Scottish crime writers
British non-fiction crime writers
British crime journalists
Organized crime writers